John Graham Wilmot Henderson is a retired Professor of Classics at Cambridge University, and a Fellow of King's College, Cambridge.

Henderson has worked within the Classics Faculty since 1975, as Assistant Lecturer (1975–1978), Lecturer (1978–1996) and Reader in Latin literature (1996–2003). He was awarded a personal professorship in Classics in 2003. Following retirement he has the status of Emeritus Professor of Classics.

His publications include collaborations with Mary Beard, his Cambridge colleague.

Publications
Books by John Henderson.

References

English classical scholars
Fellows of King's College, Cambridge
Living people
Members of the University of Cambridge faculty of classics
Scholars of Latin literature
Year of birth missing (living people)